Melanesomyia is a genus of bristle flies in the family Tachinidae.

Species
Melanesomyia kraussi Barraclough, 1997
Melanesomyia nivifera Walker, 1861
Melanesomyia wauensis Barraclough, 1997

References

Dexiinae
Diptera of Australasia
Tachinidae genera